Mikhail Ivanovich Vasilyev-Yuzhin (Russian: Михаил Иванович Васильев-Южин; 10 November 1876 – 8 November 1937) was a Russian revolutionary, Old Bolshevik, Soviet statesman and jurist, and a victim of the Great Purge.

Early career 
Vasilyev-Yuzhin was born into a working-class family in Pyatigorsk. He joined the Russian Social Democratic Labour Party in 1898 while he was an external student at Moscow University, where he graduated in 1901 from the Physics and Mathematics Faculty.

When the RSDLP split, in 1903, he joined the Bolsheviks. Early in 1905, he was sent by Vladimir Lenin to Odessa to support the sailors who had mutinied on the Battleship Potemkin, but did not reach the city until several days after the Potemkin had sailed. In the weeks preceding the Moscow uprising of 1905, he was one a troika at the head of the Moscow Bolshevik party committee, along with Virgil Shantser and Martyn Liadov, and was elected to the executive of the Moscow Soviet when it was founded in November, but was caught in a police raid on 7 December, the day the uprising began, but the police failed to identify him.

In 1906–1917, he carried out work for the Bolsheviks in Baku, St Petersburg and Saratov, and was arrested several times, though was not seriously persecuted.

Career post-1917 
During the February Revolution in 1917, Vasilyev-Yuzhin was elected deputy chairman of the Saratov Soviet, and chairman of the provincial committee of the Bolsheviks. During the October Revolution, he led the armed rising in Saratov that brought the province under Bolshevik control. When Cheka was founded in December 1917, Vasilyev-Yuzhin was appointed a member of its collegium,  and was one of the founders of the soviet militia.

During the Russian Civil War, he acted as a political commissar for the 15th army, and took part in the suppression of the Tambov Rebellion.

From January 1919 to 1922 he was a member of the Collegium of the People's Commissariat of the Interior and from December 1918 to April 1921 he was the head of the Main Police Department.

In August 1922 he was appointed a prosecutor, first with the Special Tribunal, later for the Russian Supreme Court. On 8 February 1924, he was appointed Deputy Chairman of the USSR Supreme Court. He chaired numerous trials, and was one of the panel of judges at the Shakhty Trial, the first major show trial of the Stalin era.

Vasilyev-Yuzhin was arrested in 1937, and shot on 8 November. He was posthumously 'rehabilitated'

References 

Soviet politicians
Soviet jurists
Great Purge victims
1876 births
1937 deaths
Russian revolutionaries
Russian Social Democratic Labour Party members
Old Bolsheviks
Great Purge victims from Russia
Soviet rehabilitations
People of the Russian Civil War
Executed revolutionaries
Members of the Communist Party of the Soviet Union executed by the Soviet Union